Constant Lestienne was the defending champion but chose not to defend his title.

Lukáš Klein won the title after defeating Nick Hardt 6–3, 6–4 in the final.

Seeds

Draw

Finals

Top half

Bottom half

References

External links
Main draw
Qualifying draw

JC Ferrero Challenger Open - 1